Candi, Cesare - (b Minerbio, near Bologna, 5 March 1869; d Genoa, 29 Sept 1947) was an Italian instrument maker.

References

External links
Alberto Giordano&C.      The Genoese line
::: Alberto Giordano&C. - Fine violins, violas and cellos in Genoa ::: at www.giordanoviolins.com
La Liuteria Italiana / Italian Violin Making in the 1800s and 1900s - Umberto Azzolina
I Maestri Del Novicento - Carlo Vettori 
La Liuteria Lombarda del '900 - Roberto Codazzi, Cinzia Manfredini  2002
Dictionary of 20th Century Italian Violin Makers - Marlin Brinser 1978 
 
 
 Liuteria Parmense

View a fine example of  Cesare Candi - violin 1901    close-up:
         Cesare Candi - violin 1901 top
            Cesare Candi - violin 1901  back
        Cesare Candi - violin 1901  scroll front
        Cesare Candi - violin 1901  scroll back
        Cesare Candi - violin 1901  scroll right

Living Museum

Discover the history of the Bolognese School  Bolognese Violin Makers

1869 births
1947 deaths
Italian luthiers
Businesspeople from Genoa